Jean Meichtry is a Swiss retired slalom canoeist who competed from the late 1950s to the early 1960s. He won a bronze medal in the C-2 team event at the 1961 ICF Canoe Slalom World Championships in Hainsberg.

References

Swiss male canoeists
Possibly living people
Year of birth missing (living people)
Medalists at the ICF Canoe Slalom World Championships